The Ceremonial Palace of Georgia, formerly known as the Presidential Administration of Georgia (sakartvelos prezidentis administratsia) or the Avlabari Presidential Residence, is the executive body of administration of President of Georgia. Housed in a refurbished building of the former Imperial gendarmerie, the Presidential administration is located on the left  bank of the Kura River, in the Avlabari district of Tbilisi, Georgia.

History 

The construction of the administration building commenced in 2004 on the basis of a 19th-century neoclassical edifice, which formerly housed the Imperial gendarmerie; the work was finalized in 2009. The palace was built on the initiative of President Mikheil Saakashvili. The residence officially opened on July 12, 2009, with a special ceremony being held in which up to 1,600 guests were invited, including the Catholicos-Patriarch Ilia II of Georgia, ambassadors parliamentarians, members of the government and cultural figures. Prior to its construction, the Georgian president resided at a Soviet-era complex in nearby .

2019 changes 
In 2019, the Avlabari residence was renamed and it became the Ceremonial Palace of Georgia. Members of the ruling Georgian Dream party discussed the potential function of the palace to house the Georgian National Museum. At the start of the Presidency of Salome Zourabichvili, the residence of the president was moved to the Orbeliani Palace. On 9 April 2019, the Head of the Presidential Administration Lasha Zhvania declared that "The palace will be renamed as the palace for state ceremonies."

Design 
The final version was designed by an Italian architect Michele De Lucchi who had also designed the headquarters of the Ministry of Internal Affairs, The Bridge of Peace in Tbilisi and Medea hotel in Batumi. 
Façade of the Presidential Office appears in mosaic authored by Georgian designer Natalia Amirejibi de Pita with an aphorism from the medieval Georgian poem The Knight in the Panther's Skin: "Good hath overcome ill; the essence of is lasting". The largest element of the palace are two shimmering "water mirrors"-28 long and 1,6 m high (89,6m²) mosaics in front of the complex main building called "Our background and our identity", encapsulating the entirety of Georgia's complicated and colourful history accomplished by Natalia Amirejibi de Pita.

There is a museum on the first floor of the palace, where items gifted to the President of Georgia by the leaders of different countries are exhibited. Ekvtime Takaishvili Hall is located on the second floor, which is intended for official and other important meetings. The dome of the building, constructed out of three-dimensional bent glass in Germany, was designed by a Georgian architect Vakhtang Zesashvili and Italian Architect Franc Zagari. In front of the administration building, facing the main entrance stands a rotating monument in three colors, designed by Ambassador of Georgia to Germany and granddaughter of last Emperor of Austria Charles I of Austria, Gabriela von Habsburg, representing three branches of government - legislative, executive and judicial.

See also
Government of Georgia (country)
Cabinet of Georgia

References

.
Government of Georgia (country)
Government agencies of Georgia (country)
2009 establishments in Georgia (country)
Government agencies established in 2009